The 2022 World Triathlon Championship Series was the 14th season of the World Triathlon Championship Series, the top level international series for triathlon, since its establishment in 2009, and crowned the 34th official World Triathlon Champion for both men and women since the first was crowned in 1989. 

The season consisted of seven pairs of triathlon races for both a men's and women's competition, beginning on May 14 in Yokohama, and concluding on November 26 with the grand final in Abu Dhabi. The World Champion is decided on a cumulative points basis, with the sum of their four best points scores, plus their score in Abu Dhabi, deciding the series rsnkings, medallists and champions.

The Montreal leg introduced a super-sprint eliminator format, and will host both the World Triathlon Mixed Relay Championships and World Triathlon Sprint Championships; which crowned e third World Triathlon Sprint champion for both men and women, and the tenth Mixed Relay champion team. Alex Yee and Georgia Taylor-Brown of Great Britain won their first World Sprint titles; it was Yee's first World title overall, while it was Taylor-Brown's second after her Elite World Championship win in 2020. France won the Mixed Relay title, while Great Britain, in silver, took the available Olympic Mixed Relay Qualification spot, as France had pre-qualified as hosts. The event included the world championship events for junior men and women, and the mixed relay world championship for junior and under-23 triathletes.

The grand final was held in Abu Dhabi with increased points and prize money to round off the series. As part of the event, Abu Dhabi also hosted the World Championships races in the elite under-23 category, and the six para-triathlon disciplines. Other non-title races were held for age-group athletes.

Kristian Blummenfelt and Flora Duffy began the season as defending champions from the 2021 season. While Blummenfelt, the 2021 Olympic, World and Ironman champion, had concentrated on the Ironman_70.3 events in 2022, winning his first World title in the discipline in 2022, and did not figure in the WTCS race shake-up, Duffy retained her WTCS world title, her fourth, to add to her 2022 Commonwealth Games title, winning over World Triathlon Sprint champion, 2022 Super League Triathlon champion and erstwhile rival Georgia Taylor-Brown in both the Abu Dhabi Grand Final and the overall standings, while Léo Bergère of France leapfrogged over pre-race standings leaders, 2022 Super League Triathlon champion Hayden Wilde and Commonwealth Games and World Sprint champion Alex Yee by winning the Grand Final race, taking his first overall title by just 20 points from Yee. The Abu Dhabi victory was Bergére's first ever in a WTCS event.

Overview

Calendar 

The 2022 World Triathlon Championship Series visited seven cities.

Results

Championship Series Summary (Elite)

Men 

Montreal World Seriss leg, held in super-sprint eliminator format, doubled as the stand-alone World Triathlon Sprint Championships.

Women 

* Montreal World Series leg, held under Eliminator rules, doubled as stand-alone World Triathon Sprint Championships.

Mixed Relay

Overall Standings 
In the individual events, the athlete who accumulates the most points throughout the season is declared the year's world champion.

Men

Women

List of 2022 World Championship podiums 

The following is a list of all the World Championship medalists crowned on the various legs of the World Triathlon Championship series. While the men and women's elite championships were decided over the full series, the Sprint, Mixed Relay, Under-23, Junior and Para-triathlon World Championships were all decided by single races, either on the Montreal leg (junior, sprint and both elite and u-23/Jr mixed relay) or Abu Dhabi grand final (Under-23 and paratriathlon).

* Only gold awarded as only two competitors in the class.

References 

World Triathlon Series
World Championships